Rowletts is an unincorporated community in Hart County, Kentucky, in the United States.

History
Rowletts was a station on the railroad. A post office called Rowlett's Depot was established in 1860, was renamed Rowletts in 1880, and remained in operation until it was discontinued in 1995. The community was named for John W. Rowlett, a railroad official.

References

Unincorporated communities in Hart County, Kentucky
Unincorporated communities in Kentucky